Sudi Özkan is a Turkish businessman known for his interests in the hotel and casino industry. He is alleged to be a billionaire.  He had major operations in Turkey in the 1990s before casinos were banned there in 1998, and in 1996 was considered the biggest name in the Turkish casino industry, ahead of Ömer Lütfü Topal.

He lived abroad for a time amidst allegations of tax debts, returning in 2003 after a deal with the authorities.  He currently resides in Istanbul as well as St. Martin, a small island in the Atlantic Ocean. He currently owns 34 casinos and 18 first class hotels in 15 countries, and numerous companies with activities in the energy, entertainment and hospitality sectors. He is also well known in Turkey for his contributions in charitable organisations along with donations of schools and hospitals."

References 

Living people
Turkish businesspeople
Businesspeople in the casino industry
Turkish billionaires
Year of birth missing (living people)